Reasonable Blackman ( 1579–1592) (also possibly known as John Reason and Reasonable Blackmore) was a silk weaver resident in Southwark, London, in the late sixteenth century. He was among the earliest people of African heritage to be living and working as an independent business owner in London in that era. He may have come to London via the Netherlands, which had a relatively significant African population at the time and also a significant trade in silk, although his original provenance is unknown.

The first record of Blackman is in the records of St Saviour's church (later Southwark Cathedral) in 1579. By 1587 Blackman was married and therefore clearly had sufficient means to support a family. It has been suggested that he made costumes for the theatres in the area. He had at least three children, of whom at least one (Edward) was baptised at St Olave's Church, Southwark in 1587, and a fourth child with a similar surname who was also baptised at St Olave's may also have been his. Two of his children, Edmund and Jane, died in 1592 of plague. They were buried with due ritual in St Olave's churchyard.

The name and ethnicity of Blackman's wife are unknown. The small number of people of African descent in London at this time makes it likely she was a white Englishwoman.

References 

16th-century African people
People of the Elizabethan era